Pok Fu Lam Road, or Pokfulam Road, is a four-lane road in Hong Kong. Built on Hong Kong Island, the road runs between Sai Ying Pun and Wah Fu, through Pok Fu Lam.

Description
It runs south from Sai Ying Pun, passing The University of Hong Kong along the Belcher's, with a road junction with Pokfield Road. The vegetation in this area is largely preserved, unlike many roads in the urban built-up areas of Hong Kong. Further south, the Pok Fu Lam playground, a public playground, is located near the junction with Mount Davis Road in Mount Davis. Down the road, Queen Mary Hospital, a large hospital complex, borders the junction with Sassoon Road and Bisney Road. Recently, the junction was renovated into a large intersection with highway loops, to ease traffic congestion. Further down the road, there is a large reservoir, a school for the blind, a vocational education centre and two large housing complexes: Chi Fu Fa Yuen and Pokfulam Gardens. The road ends at the Pokfulam Fire Station.

Spelling
The road name is always spelled as Three words Pok Fu Lam Road (see road sign above), and not Pokfulam Road.

Along Pok Fu Lam Road is a property development, The Belcher's, built in 2000–2001.

Intersections
 
Listed from south to north.

One-way section
Listed from north to south.

See also
 Ricci Hall, located at No. 93 Pok Fu Lam Road
 Queen Mary Hospital, located at No. 102 Pok Fu Lam Road
 Hong Kong Chinese Christian Churches Union Pok Fu Lam Road Cemetery, located at No. 125 Pok Fu Lam Road
 Béthanie, located at No. 139 Pok Fu Lam Road
 University Hall, located at No. 144 Pok Fu Lam Road, a student hall of the University of Hong Kong
 List of streets and roads in Hong Kong

References

External links

Google Maps of Pok Fu Lam Road

Pok Fu Lam
Sai Ying Pun
Roads on Hong Kong Island